Fradley is a village and former civil parish, now in the parish of Fradley and Streethay, in the Lichfield district, in the county of Staffordshire, England. In 1881 the parish had a population of 380.

Location 

History 
Fradley first appeared in 12th-century records as 'Frodeleye', or 'Frod's lea'. Fradley was formerly a township and chapelry in the parish of Alrewas, from 1866 Fradley was a civil parish in its own right, on 25 March 1884 the parish was abolished and merged with Alrewas, on 1 February 1996 that "Alrewas" was renamed "Alrewas and Fradley", on 1 April 2009 it became part of "Fradley and Streethay". Following the completion of the Stirling Centre near Fradley South in 2009, comprising retail units, offices and food outlets, Fradley was formally re-categorised as a 'key rural settlement'.

Village amenities
Fradley has its own village hall which was completed in the early 2000s and an additional community hall on adjacent land. The village church, St. Stephen's Church, was built in 1861 on the corner of Church Lane and Old Hall Lane.  A Victorian schoolhouse, which had stood beside the church since 1875, was demolished in 2008 to make room for modern classrooms at St. Stephen's Primary School.

Fradley is close to the A38 road Ryknild Street (which became a dual-carriageway in 1958) and is served by bus services to Lichfield and Burton upon Trent. A railway line passes close to the eastern side of the village but no station exists in Fradley, the nearest passenger station is now Lichfield Trent Valley railway station serving the West Coast Main Line, the London-Crewe line and acting as the terminus for the Cross-City Line.  From 1849 until 1965, Alrewas railway station on the South Staffordshire Line was the closest passenger station to Fradley but was closed on 18 January 1965 by the British Railways Board.

The Coventry Canal runs through the village and merges with the Trent and Mersey Canal at nearby Fradley Junction.  Several bridges cross the Coventry Canal in Fradley, including Bell Bridge which carries the A38.

Fradley has a small Post Office/newsagent located in Church Lane and there are several retail units at the Stirling Centre near Fradley South - including two take-away restaurants, a Co-operative Food convenience store, a cafe, a hair salon and a gym. The Fradley Arms Hotel is located adjacent to the southbound carriageway of the A38, next door to the Premier Inn Lichfield and a new public house is planned for a site near Fradley Park.

Currently, more new houses are being built adjacent to the Stirling Centre - this estate is nominally called Sheasby Park. This will be a large addition to the village and will introduce 700 new houses to the wider Fradley South development.

Fradley Aerodrome/RAF Lichfield

Construction on the Fradley Aerodrome (known as RAF Lichfield) started in 1939 and in August 1940 the Royal Air Force moved in, along with Hawker Hurricane, Airspeed Oxford and Avro Anson aircraft. Spitfire arrived in 1941 and Vickers Wellington aircraft followed in 1942. Alongside RAF personnel training in the Wellingtons, there were a large number of Australians and some Canadians and Czechs.  The RAF left in 1958 and the whole site was sold by the Air Ministry in 1962.

St. Stephen's Church is home to the war graves of a number of Australian aircrew and one German Luftwaffe pilot who lost their lives during World War II.  In 2000 a memorial to all who served at RAF Lichfield was constructed in Fradley.

Fradley Park
In 1998 major redevelopment started on the former airfield, with the construction of factories, warehouses and 750 new houses. Today Fradley Park, a 300-acre warehousing and distribution development, covers most of the former airfield.  Tenants of Fradley Park include Tesco, Faurecia, Hellman Worldwide Logistics, NTN Bearings (UK), Newell Rubbermaid, Caterpillar Logistics, Swish UK  Zytek and Palletways Birmingham.

Fradley Junction

Fradley was first mentioned in 1768 when the Engineer James Brindley won the contract to build the canal from Coventry, to link with the Trent and Mersey Canal at Fradley. It was not until 1783 that this canal was completed, meeting the Trent and Mersey at Fradley Junction.

Bown Pond 
Bown Pond is a man-made area of water to the south west of Fradley village. The pond was excavated for clay and gravel during the construction of the Coventry canal in 1782. The materials were manufactured into bricks at the brickyard at Hilliard’s Cross. The Bown Pond was originally round and was one of several such pits in the area around Fradley Junction which have since been filled. The pond is named after Josiah Bown, a tenant farmer on the Bridge farm estate, who is said to have drowned in the pond in 1820 on his way back from the Bull’s Head Inn, Rikneld Street.

When the area was taken over by the Air Ministry in 1939 for the development of RAF Lichfield this small lake became a popular meeting place for Australian airman who were based at the station. In the 1940s Bown Pond had a small stock of fish, mainly carp, an annual children’s fishing competition took place until the mid fifties when the pond became choked with weed. After RAF Lichfield was decommissioned in 1958 the pond was left untended until the early 2000s.

Landscaping works in 2003 cleared and re-shaped the pond to its current kidney shape. It was re-purposed as a balancing pond for the adjacent housing development to mitigate against surface water flooding. The island in the middle of the pond was also cleared revealing the remains of a small diving platform that had been constructed on the island during WW2. The remains of this are still visible today.

The area around the pond is collectively known as Bown Pond, much of the area now forms part of the Fradley South and Sheasby Park housing developments. The Sterling Centre shops and leisure facilities are on the site which was previously Bown Pond Lane. The lane ran from Common Lane at Bown Pond and joined onto Gorse Lane, following the route which eventually became runway 17 at RAF Lichfield.

During the construction of the second phase of the Fradley South Housing development the pond has been further landscaped and is popular with dog walkers.

See also
Listed buildings in Fradley and Streethay

References

External links
Fradley Park and Stirling Centre

Villages in Staffordshire
Former civil parishes in Staffordshire
Lichfield District